Paul Kraus (born 1944) is a Holocaust survivor and mesothelioma patient. Paul Kraus may also refer to:

Paul Kraus (Arabist) (1904–1944), Jewish Arabist
Paul Krauß (1917–1942), German ski jumper
Paul Krause (born 1942), American football safety